The Beacon Limestone Formation, historically known as the Junction Bed, is a formation of early Jurassic age (Pliensbachian–Toarcian). It lies above the Dyrham Formation and below the Bridport Sand Formation. It forms part of the Lias Group. It is found within the Wessex Basin and parts of Somerset, in England. It is well known for the Strawberry Bank Lagerstätte, which contains the 3-dimensionally preserved remains of vertebrates, including marine crocodyliformes, ichthyosaurs and fish, as well as insect compression fossils.

Fossil content 
Among others, the following fossils have been reported from the formation:

Vertebrates

Invertebrates

References 

Geologic formations of England
Jurassic System of Europe
Jurassic England
Pliensbachian Stage
Toarcian Stage
Limestone formations
Shallow marine deposits
Paleontology in England
Geology of Dorset
Geology of Somerset